Curtin University Malaysia, previously known as Curtin University, Sarawak Malaysia is a private university in Miri, Sarawak and is the largest international campus of Curtin University, a university based in Perth, Western Australia. It has a  campus comprising academic and residential blocks. The university provides local and international students with higher education in Sarawak, Malaysia.

History 
The Sarawak State Government invited Curtin to establish an international university in Sarawak. Curtin Malaysia's operations in Miri commenced in February 1999. Curtin Malaysia is Curtin University's first international campus, followed by Curtin Singapore that opened in 2008, Curtin Dubai that opened in 2017 and Curtin Mauritius that opened in 2018.

Located in Miri, Curtin Malaysia offers a cross-cultural learning experience with students from more than 50 different countries and teaching staff from more than 15 countries. Besides being the first offshore campus of Curtin University, it is also the first offshore campus set up in East Malaysia. In November 1999, Curtin Malaysia was awarded the Multimedia Super Corridor status which was renewed in 2006. In 2002, the new campus was built.

University rankings 

Curtin University is ranked 201-300th and top two per cent of universities worldwide in the 2020 Academic Ranking of World Universities. It is ranked 17th in the world for universities under the age of 50 in the 2021 QS World University Rankings and has received a five star overall excellence rating in the QS stars rating 2019.

Curtin was ranked 194th in the 2022 annual QS World University Rankings. The following subject areas that are available at Curtin University Malaysia Campus are strongly ranked and have received a five-star rating in the QS World University Rankings by Subject 2020:
Accounting and Finance (top 100)
Chemical Engineering (top 100)
Civil and Structural Engineering (top 100)
Communication and Media Studies (top 100)
Computer Science and Information Systems (top 200)
Earth and Marine Sciences (top 100)
Electrical and Electronic Engineering (top 200)
Environmental Studies (top 150).

Academic Programs

Pre-University studies
Pre-University Programs at Curtin University Malaysia Campus prepare students for university study.

Language Studies and Humanities
 Intensive English Program (IEP)

Foundation Studies
 Commerce and Arts Stream
 Engineering and Science Stream

Undergraduate Degree studies

Faculty of Business
The faculty offers qualifications that are accredited by international as well as national professional associations and governmental agencies.

Bachelor of Commerce:
 Bachelor of Arts (Media, Culture and Communication) 
 Bachelor of Business Administration 
 Bachelor of Commerce (Accounting) 
 Bachelor of Commerce (Finance)

Bachelor of Commerce with double majors:
 Accounting and Finance 
 Accounting and Banking  
 Accounting and Entrepreneurship 
 Banking and Finance 
 Entrepreneurship and Marketing 
 Finance and Marketing 
 Finance and Management 
 Management and Marketing 
 Public Relations and Management 
 Marketing and Public Relations 
 Tourism, Hospitality and Marketing

Faculty of Engineering and Science
The Faculty of Engineering and Science at Curtin Malaysia was established in 2000. It offers Engineering and Science courses, including the four-year  Bachelor of Engineering (Hons) degree and the three-year Bachelor of Science degree. The school offers doctoral and masters programs. Academics from the faculty are active in research and in consultancy activities through Curtin Consultancy Services.

Bachelor of Engineering:
 Chemical Engineering 
 Civil and Construction Engineering 
 Electrical Power Engineering 
 Electronic and Communication Engineering 
 Environmental Engineering 
 Mechanical Engineering 
 Petroleum Engineering

Bachelor of Science:
 Applied Geology

Bachelor of Technology majoring:
 Computer Systems and Networking

Faculty of Humanities and Health Science 
The facility offers three courses.
 Bachelor of Communications
 Bachelor of Science (Health, Safety and Environment)
 Bachelor of Science (Psychological Science)

Postgraduate studies
 Graduate Certificate in Project Management (R2/345/6/0394)
 Graduate Diploma in Project Management (R2/345/6/1071)
 Master of Science (Project Management) (R2/345/7/0396)
 Master of Engineering Science (Electrical Engineering) (R/522/7/0062)
 Master of Petroleum Engineering (R/524/7/0047)
 Master of Philosophy (F1-K040/KA4658):
- Electrical and Computer Engineering
- Mechanical Engineering
- Civil Engineering
- Chemical Engineering
- Applied Geology

 Master of Philosophy (Accounting) (N/344/6/0150)
 Master of Philosophy (Business Law and Taxation)(N/481/6/0272)
 Master of Philosophy (Economic and Finance)(N/314/6/0012)
 Master of Philosophy (Information Systems)(N/481/6/0273)
 Master of Philosophy (Management) (N/481/6/0274)
 Master of Philosophy (Marketing) (N/340/6/0228)
 Master of Philosophy (Public Relations) (N/321/6/0063)
 Doctor of Philosophy (F1–K040)
 Doctor of Philosophy (F1-K027)

Office of Research & Development 
Curtin University Sarawak set up "Office of Research & Development", focusing on engineering and science, business, education, and humanities studies.

Australian affiliation
Curtin Malaysia offers identical degrees to those at the Curtin University main campus in Western Australia. Examinations for the degree programs are set and moderated at Curtin's main campus in Perth to ensure that they meet and fulfill the same academic standards. Academics from Perth visit the Curtin Sarawak campus for quality audits and for consultations on issues ranging from assignments, projects, tasks and other assessments.

See also 

 List of universities in Malaysia

References

External links

Curtin University, Perth Main Campus

Malaysia
Miri, Malaysia
Universities and colleges in Sarawak
Engineering universities and colleges in Malaysia
Educational institutions established in 1999
1999 establishments in Malaysia
Australia–Malaysia relations
Private universities and colleges in Malaysia